Emine Bozkurt (born 9 August 1967) is a Dutch politician of Turkish descent and Member of the European Parliament between 2004 and 2014. She is a member of the Dutch Labour Party, which is part of the Party of European Socialists.

In the European Parliament she was a member of the Committee on Civil Liberties, Justice and Home Affairs and the Committee on Women's Rights and Gender Equality. Furthermore, she was the chairperson of the Delegation for Relations with the Countries of Central America, as well as a substitute member of the Committee on Foreign Affairs.

Early life
Emine Bozkurt was born in Zaandam, North Holland to a Dutch mother and a Turkish father. She currently lives in Zaandam and Brussels.

Education
 VWO at Zaanlands Lyceum (1985)
 Bachelor's degree in French Language and Literature, University of Amsterdam (1987)
 Master's degree in European Studies, University of Amsterdam (1992)
 Qualification from the Netherlands Association for Public Relations and Information (NGPR) (1995)
 Public relations diploma, Foundation for Advertising and Marketing Education (SRM) (1997)

Career
 Staff member of the consulate-general, Germany (1992–1993)
 Spokeswoman and head of internal and external relations, Dutch Muslim Broadcasting Company (1993–1997)
 Publisher and spokeswoman, Rathenau Institute (1997–2001)
 Senior adviser, Radar - advice bureau on social issues (2001–2004)
 Member of the Amsterdam PvdA executive (1998–1999)
 Member of the PvdA European policy advisory committee (since 1999)
 Member of the core group of the PvdA multi-ethnic women's network (1997–2001)
 Member of the review committee on public broadcasting (Rinnooy-Kan Committee) (2002–2003)
 Member of the disputes committee of the National Committee for International Cooperation and Sustainable Development (NCDO) (since 2002)
 Member of the governing body of the Institute for Public and Politics (civic education)

Member of the European Parliament
During her terms, Bozkurt was involved in the following committees:
 Chairperson delegation for relations with the countries of Central America (2009–2014)
 Committee on Civil Liberties, Justice and Home Affairs (2009–2014)
 Committee on Women's Rights and Gender Equality (2004–2014)
 Special committee on organised crime, corruption and money laundering (2012–2013)
 Delegation to the Euro-Latin American Parliamentary Assembly (2009–2014)
 Substitute member Committee on Foreign Affairs (2009–2012)
 Substitute member of the Delegation to the EU-Turkey Joint Parliamentary Committee (2009–2013)
 Chairperson of the Friends of Football
 Chairperson of the Friends of Bosnia and Herzegovina
 Chairperson of the Anti-Racism and Diversity Intergroup
 Member of Intergroup for Lesbian, Gay, Bisexual and Transgender (LGBT) rights
 Member of the Committee on Employment and Social Affairs (2004-2009)
 Member of the Committee on Culture and Education (2004-2009)
 Member of the Delegation to the EU-Turkey Joint Parliamentary Committee (2004-2009)

References

External links 

  Emine Bozkurt at the website of the Labour Party

1967 births
Living people
Dutch Muslims
Dutch people of Turkish descent
Dutch women in politics
Labour Party (Netherlands) MEPs
MEPs for the Netherlands 2004–2009
MEPs for the Netherlands 2009–2014
21st-century women MEPs for the Netherlands
People from Zaanstad